Paparazzi (singular: masculine paparazzo or feminine paparazza) are independent photographers who take pictures of high-profile people; such as actors, musicians, athletes, politicians, and other celebrities, typically while subjects go about their usual life routines. Paparazzi tend to make a living by selling their photographs to media outlets that focus on tabloid journalism and sensationalism (such as gossip magazines).

Description
Paparazzi tend to be independent contractors, unaffiliated with mainstream media organizations, and photos taken are usually done so by taking advantage of opportunities when they have sightings of high-profile people they are tracking. Some experts have described the behavior of paparazzi as synonymous with stalking, and anti-stalking laws in many countries address the issue by seeking to reduce harassment of public figures and celebrities, especially when they are with their children. Some public figures and celebrities have expressed concern at the extent to which paparazzi go to invade their personal space. The filing and receiving of judicial support for restraining orders against paparazzi has increased, as have lawsuits with judgments against them.

Famous paparazzi
Walter Santesso portrays Paparazzo in the 1960 film La Dolce Vita, marking the character as the eponym of the word paparazzi.

Ron Galella is well known for his obsessive stalking of several celebrities, most notably Jacqueline Kennedy Onassis. Galella has been defined "the Godfather of the U.S. paparazzi culture".

Rino Barillari is an Italian paparazzo known as the "King of the Paparazzi" in Italy. He was awarded the Order of Merit of the Italian Republic in 1998.

Etymology
A news photographer named Paparazzo (played by Walter Santesso in the 1960 film La Dolce Vita directed by Federico Fellini) is the eponym of the word paparazzi. In his book The Facts on File Encyclopedia of Word and Phrase Origins, Robert Hendrickson writes that Fellini named the "hyperactive photographer ... after Italian slang for 'mosquito.'" As Fellini said in his interview to Time magazine, "Paparazzo ... suggests to me a buzzing insect, hovering, darting, stinging." Those versions of the word's origin are sometimes contested. For example, in the Abruzzo dialect spoken by Ennio Flaiano, co-scriptwriter of La Dolce Vita, the term paparazzo refers to the local clam, Venerupis decussata, and is also used as a metaphor for the shutter of a camera lens.

Further, in an interview with Fellini's screenwriter Flaiano, he said the name came from the book Sulla riva dello Jonio (1957), a translation by Italian poet Margherita Guidacci of By the Ionian Sea, a 1901 travel narrative in southern Italy by Victorian writer George Gissing. He further states that either Fellini or Flaiano opened the book at random, saw the name of a restaurant owner, Coriolano Paparazzo, and decided to use it for the photographer. This story is further documented by a variety of Gissing scholars and in the book A Sweet and Glorious Land. Revisiting the Ionian Sea.
By the late 1960s, the word, usually in the Italian plural form paparazzi, had entered English as a generic term for intrusive photographers. A person who has been photographed by the paparazzi is said to have been "papped".

In other languages
A transliteration of paparazzi is used in several languages that do not use the Latin alphabet, including Japanese, Korean, Ukrainian, Russian, Bulgarian (папараци), Thai and Hebrew. Chinese uses , meaning "puppy squad". Khmer uses  (anak bramanh roub).

Legality
Due to the reputation of paparazzi as a nuisance, several countries and states restrict their activities by passing laws and curfews, and by staging events in which paparazzi are specifically not allowed to take photographs. In the United States, celebrity news organizations are protected by the First Amendment.

To protect the children of celebrities, California passed Senate Bill No. 606 in September 2013. The purpose of the bill is to stop paparazzi from taking pictures of children or wards in a harassing manner because of their parent's occupation. This law increased the penalty for harassment of children.  California Civil Code sections 1708.7 and 1708.8 explicitly address stalking and invasion of physical privacy.

Injunctions

In 1972, paparazzo photographer Ron Galella sued Jacqueline Kennedy Onassis after the former First Lady ordered her Secret Service agents to destroy Galella's camera and film following an encounter in New York City's Central Park. Kennedy counter-sued claiming harassment. The trial lasted three weeks and became a groundbreaking case regarding photojournalism and the role of paparazzi. In Galella v. The trial is a focal point in Smash His Camera, a 2010 documentary film by director Leon Gast.

In 1997, Diana, Princess of Wales and Dodi Fayed were killed in a limousine crash as their driver was speeding, trying to escape paparazzi. An inquest jury investigated the role of paparazzi in the incident, but no one was convicted. The official inquests into the accident attributed the causes to the speed and manner of driving of the Mercedes, as well as the following vehicles, and the impairment of the judgment of the Mercedes driver, Henri Paul, through alcohol.

In 1999, the Oriental Daily News of Hong Kong was found guilty of "scandalizing the court", an extremely rare charge where the judiciary find that the newspaper's conduct undermines confidence in the administration of justice. The charge was brought after the newspaper had published abusive articles challenging the judiciary's integrity and accusing it of bias in a lawsuit the paper had instigated over a photo of a pregnant Faye Wong. The paper had also arranged for a "dog team" (slang for paparazzi in the Chinese language) to track a judge for 72 hours, to provide the judge with first-hand experience of what paparazzi do.

Time magazine's Style & Design special issue in 2005 ran a story entitled "Shooting Star", in which Mel Bouzad, one of the top paparazzi in Los Angeles at the time, claimed to have made US$150,000 for a picture of Ben Affleck and Jennifer Lopez in Georgia after their breakup. "If I get a picture of Britney and her baby," Bouzad claimed, "I'll be able to buy a house in those hills (above Sunset Boulevard)." Paparazzi author Peter Howe told Time that "celebrities need a higher level of exposure than the rest of us so it is a two-way street. The celebrities manipulate."

In 2006, Daniella Cicarelli went through a scandal when a paparazzo caught video footage of her having sex with her boyfriend on a beach in Spain, which was posted on YouTube. After fighting in the court, it was decided in her favor, causing YouTube to be blocked in Brazil. This caused major havoc among Brazilians, including threatening a boycott against MTV Brasil, where Cicarelli worked, unless she was fired. The block only lasted a few days, and Cicarelli was not dismissed. The legal action backfired as the court decided she had no expectation of privacy by having sex in a public location.

The E! network program Celebrities Uncensored used often-confrontational footage of celebrities made by paparazzi.

Following the publication of photographs showing Catherine, Duchess of Cambridge sunbathing whilst topless at the French holiday home of her husband's cousin Viscount Linley, it was announced on September 14, 2012, that the royal couple were to launch legal action against the French edition of Closer magazine. It was the first time that a senior British royal has sued in a court outside the UK. The reason cited for the legal action is that the Duchess had a right of privacy whilst at the home—the magazine responded that the pictures had been taken from the public highway. The injunction was granted on September 18, 2012, and the publishers of the magazine were ordered not to publish the photographs in France and not to sell the images. The publishers were also ordered to hand over the original material of the published pictures under threat of a €10,000 fine for every day of delay in doing so.

In the United Kingdom, Sienna Miller, Amy Winehouse, and Lily Allen have won injunctions that prevent the paparazzi from following them and gathering outside their houses. Miller was awarded £53,000.

In 2013, rapper Kanye West faced assault charges after attacking a photojournalist. He stated that he would fight to get the law changed, so celebrities can profit from paparazzi's work.

Other measures
In addition to legal action, celebrities have taken other measures to avoid paparazzi. When Daniel Radcliffe was performing in the play Equus in London, he wore the same hat and jacket every day for six months, to make the photos look old and therefore "unpublishable".

References

External links

Celebrity
Criticism of journalism
Federico Fellini
Journalism ethics
Media bias controversies
Photojournalism
1960s neologisms
Italian words and phrases